Korab III is a mountain peak located in eastern Albania. Korab III is a peak of Mount Korab and is the third highest peak of this mountain.

References

Mountains of Albania